Sladkodum is a village located in Krumovgrad Municipality, Kardzhali Province, southern Bulgaria.

References

Villages in Kardzhali Province